Poix-du-Nord is a commune in the Nord department in northern France.

Heraldry

Town twinning
 Keighley, West Yorkshire, United Kingdom

See also
Communes of the Nord department

References

Poixdunord